Catherine Elizabeth Frances Harrison (born April 9, 1994) is an American tennis player.

She has career-high WTA rankings of world No. 214 in singles, achieved on September 12, 2022, and world No. 69 in doubles, reached on July 11, 2022.

Professional career
Harrison made her WTA Tour main-draw debut at the 2011 Cellular South Cup, after receiving a wildcard for the singles competition.

She won her first doubles title at the 2022 Monterrey Open, partnering compatriot Sabrina Santamaria.

She made her Grand Slam doubles debut at the 2022 French Open and qualified to make her singles debut at the 2022 Wimbledon Championships, having never contested a major qualifying event before.

College career
She played college tennis at the University of California, Los Angeles (UCLA).

Performance timelines
Only main-draw results in WTA Tour, Grand Slam tournaments, Billie Jean King Cup and Olympic Games are included in win–loss records.

Singles
Current after the 2022 US Open.

Doubles

WTA career finals

Doubles: 1 (1 title)

ITF Circuit finals

Singles: 4 (2 titles, 2 runner-ups)

Doubles: 19 (11 titles, 8 runner-ups)

Notes

References

External links
 
 
 

1994 births
Living people
American female tennis players
People from Germantown, Tennessee
Sportspeople from Memphis, Tennessee
UCLA Bruins women's tennis players
Tennis people from Tennessee